Judith Ann Strong (born March 26, 1960) is a former field hockey player from the United States, who was a member of the Women's National Team that won the bronze medal at the 1984 Summer Olympics in Los Angeles, California. She briefly coached field hockey at Western New England University located in Springfield, Massachusetts. Currently, Strong is a field hockey and lacrosse referee at the collegiate level.

Strong played collegiate field hockey at the University of Massachusetts Amherst.  She was a physical education teacher at Smith College where she also coached field hockey and lacrosse.

References

External links
 
 databaseOlympics
 Smith College – Judy Strong
 

1960 births
Living people
American female field hockey players
UMass Minutewomen field hockey players
Field hockey players at the 1984 Summer Olympics
Olympic bronze medalists for the United States in field hockey
Smith College faculty
Place of birth missing (living people)
Medalists at the 1984 Summer Olympics
People from Northampton, Massachusetts
American women academics